Letters Home is the third studio album by American melodic hardcore band Defeater. Like their previous releases, Letters Home is a concept album, following the story of the father of the characters from these releases prior to the events of Travels.

Reception

Letters Home received positive reviews from critics. On Metacritic, the album holds a score 81/100 based on 8 reviews, indicating "universal acclaim."

Track listing

Personnel
Defeater
Derek Archambault
Joe Longobardi
Jay Maas
Mike Poulin
Jake Woodruff

References

Defeater (band) albums
Bridge 9 Records albums